= The Dilly Boys =

1973 book by Mervyn Harris

- Author: Mervyn Harris
- Genre: Nonfiction
- Publisher: New Perspectives
- Publication date: January 1973
- Publication place: United Kingdom
- Pages: 126
- ISBN: 978-0856640209

The Dilly Boys: The Game of Male Prostitution in Piccadilly is a 1973 book by Mervyn Harris. The book describes the stories of homosexual boys aged 15 to 23 who engage in hustle culture at the Piccadilly Circus area of West End London. Despite its title, the book mainly focuses on topics other than prostitution.
